Ghada is a feminine given name of Arabic origin, is used mostly in Arabic speaking countries, but also in a few other countries and languages of the world. In Arabic, it refers to women who are graceful and active, tender and enchanting, giving and enlightening.

It may also refer to a small tree: Haloxylon persicum.

List
Notable people with the name include:

Ghada Abdel Aal (born 1978), Egyptian author 
Ghada Adel (born 1974), Egyptian actress
Ghada Ali (born 1989), Libyan athlete
Ghada Amer (born 1963), Egyptian contemporary artist living and working in New York City
Ghada Aoun (born 1957), Lebanese judge
Ghada Chreim Ata (born 1968), Lebanese politician 
Ghada Ayadi (born 1992), Tunisian football player
Ghada Hassine (born 1993), Tunisian weightlifter
Ghada Jamal, multiple people
Ghada Jamshir, Bahraini women's rights activist and campaigner for the reform of Sharia courts in Bahrain and the Arab States of the Persian Gulf
Ghada Karmi (born 1939), Palestinian doctor of medicine, author and academic
Ghada Owais (born 1977), Lebanese journalist
Ghada Abdel Razek (born 1965), Egyptian actress
Ghada al-Samman (born 1942), Arab Syrian writer, journalist and novelist born in Damascus
Ghada Shouaa (born 1972), Syrian former heptathlete
Ghada Waly (born 1965), Egyptian politician

References

Arabic feminine given names
Lebanese feminine given names
Egyptian feminine given names